Liza Loop (née Straus) is an educational technology pioneer, futurist, technical author, and consultant. She is notable for her early use of computers in education, her creation of a public-access computer center, consulting work with Atari, Inc., Apple, Radio Shack and others as well as philosophical musings on the future of learning environments from the 1970s on.

Early life
Loop was raised in Massachusetts and attended Dana Hall; her mother was a science teacher at Dana Hall and her father was an engineer at the Massachusetts Institute of Technology. Loop attended Cornell University starting in 1963, and later Sonoma State University's graduate school where she was influenced by Stanford University psychologist Dean Brown.

Career
In 1975, Loop joined the Homebrew Computer Club and was the first woman to join the club, and founded the LO*OP Center (Learning Options * Open Portal) non-profit organization. In 1975 LO*OP opened the second public access computer center located outside a museum. After visiting the center, Apple co-founder Steve Wozniak was impressed enough with her work that he gave her an original Apple I computer to use in her center. For most of 1976 the center's Apple I was the only Apple I in the North Bay.

In 1978, when Atari was developing the Atari 800 home computer, Loop was brought in as a consultant to help meet the market for home computers that children and adults could use for learning.

The Liza Loop Papers from 1972 to 1984 (donated in 1986) are housed in Stanford University Libraries'  manuscript division and detail the early years of educational computing.

In the early 21st century, she became an advocate of preserving the early history of computing in education.

Bibliography

Notes

References

External links
 
 LO*OP Center, Inc., Learning Options*Open Portal, non-profit educational project founded by Liza Loop, Dean Brown and Stuart Cooney
 

Living people
American technology writers
Women technology writers
Educators from California
American women educators
Year of birth missing (living people)
21st-century American women